Bugie may refer to:
 Elizabeth Bugie (1920–2001), American biochemist
 An old spelling of Béjaïa, Algeria
 An Italian sweet pastry; see angel wings#Italy